Dashtineh (also Romanized as Dashtīneh) is a village in Armand Rural District, in the Central District of Lordegan County, Chaharmahal and Bakhtiari Province, Iran. At the 2006 census, its population was 274, in 55 families.

References 

Populated places in Lordegan County